Bay of Bengal is a Bangladeshi experimental rock/metal band formed in Chittagong in 2010. Their debut album Nirob Durvikkho was released in 2016. They are well known for their usage of distinct flutes and keyboard solos in their songs.

History 
The band formed on 26 December in 2010. Their first album Nirob Durvikkho has 10 songs, which released on 20 February 2016. Till 2015, they worked on 17 songs. Among those they selected 10 songs for their first album. They made their first music video of the song "Je Sohore Ami Nei" from the album.

Discography 
 নীরব দুর্ভিক্ষ (Nirob Durvikkho) (2016)
 ঘুম (Ghum) (2017)
 জ্যোৎস্নার স্নান (Jochhona Snan) (2019)
 বিষণ্ণতার গান (Bishonnotar Gaan) (2020)

Members 
 Bakhtiar Hossain - lead vocals, rhythm guitar, flutes
 Kazi Wahid Altaher (Tanim) - lead guitar
 Ahtesham Abid - bass guitar
 Jamilur Rahman Jamee - keyboards
 Abid Pasha - drums

References 

Musical groups established in 2010
Bangladeshi rock music groups
Experimental rock groups
2010 establishments in Bangladesh